This is a list of Alabama Civil War Confederate Units.

Infantry
Alabama Brigade
1st Alabama Infantry Regiment
Perote Guards (Company D)
2nd Alabama Infantry Regiment
3rd Alabama Infantry Regiment
4th Alabama Infantry Regiment  
5th Alabama Infantry Regiment
6th Alabama Infantry Regiment
7th Alabama Infantry Regiment
8th Alabama Infantry Regiment
9th Alabama Infantry Regiment
10th Alabama Infantry Regiment
11th Alabama Infantry Regiment
12th Alabama Infantry Regiment
13th Alabama Infantry Regiment
14th Alabama Infantry Regiment
15th Alabama Infantry Regiment
16th Alabama Infantry Regiment
17th Alabama Infantry Regiment
18th Alabama Infantry Regiment
19th Alabama Infantry Regiment
20th Alabama Infantry Regiment
21st Alabama Infantry Regiment
22nd Alabama Infantry Regiment
23rd Alabama Infantry Regiment
24th Alabama Infantry Regiment
25th Alabama Infantry Regiment
26th Alabama Infantry Regiment
27th Alabama Infantry Regiment
28th Alabama Infantry Regiment
29th Alabama Infantry Regiment
30th Alabama Infantry Regiment
31st Alabama Infantry Regiment
32nd Alabama Infantry Regiment
33rd Alabama Infantry Regiment
34th Alabama Infantry Regiment
35th Alabama Infantry Regiment
36th Alabama Infantry Regiment
37th Alabama Infantry Regiment
38th Alabama Infantry Regiment
39th Alabama Infantry Regiment
40th Alabama Infantry Regiment
41st Alabama Infantry Regiment
42nd Alabama Infantry Regiment
43rd Alabama Infantry Regiment
44th Alabama Infantry Regiment
45th Alabama Infantry Regiment
46th Alabama Infantry Regiment
47th Alabama Infantry Regiment
48th Alabama Infantry Regiment
49th Alabama Infantry Regiment (This regiment was successively designated as 52nd Regiment (Hale’s) Alabama Infantry, 31st Regiment (Edwards’), Alabama Infantry, and 49th Regiment Alabama Infantry)
50th Alabama Infantry Regiment (originally designated 26th Alabama)
51st Alabama Infantry Regiment
52nd Alabama Infantry Regiment
53rd Alabama Infantry Regiment
54th Alabama Infantry Regiment
55th Alabama Infantry Regiment
56th Alabama Infantry Regiment
57th Alabama Infantry Regiment
58th Alabama Infantry Regiment
59th Alabama Infantry Regiment
60th Alabama Infantry Regiment
61st Alabama Infantry Regiment 
62nd Alabama Infantry Regiment (1st Reserves)
63rd Alabama Infantry Regiment (2nd Reserves)
65th Alabama Infantry Regiment (4th Reserves)
1st Alabama Infantry Battalion
4th Alabama Infantry Battalion
5th Alabama Infantry Battalion
6th Alabama Infantry Battalion
9th Alabama Infantry Battalion
16th Alabama Infantry Battalion
17th Alabama Infantry Battalion
18th (Gibson's) Alabama Infantry Battalion (1st Battalion Partisan Rangers)
23rd Alabama Sharpshooter Battalion

Cavalry

1st Alabama Cavalry Regiment
2nd Alabama Cavalry Regiment
3rd Alabama Cavalry Regiment
Prattville Dragoons (priorly Co. I, 7th Alabama Infantry)
4th Alabama Cavalry Regiment (Forrest's)
5th Alabama Cavalry Regiment
6th Alabama Cavalry Regiment
7th Alabama Cavalry Regiment
8th Alabama Cavalry Regiment
8th Alabama Cavalry Regiment
9th Alabama Cavalry Regiment
10th Alabama Cavalry Regiment
11th Alabama Cavalry Regiment (10th Regiment -  Burtwell's)
12th Alabama Cavalry Regiment
51st Alabama Cavalry Regiment (Partisan Rangers)
53rd Alabama Cavalry Regiment (Partisan Rangers)
54th Alabama Cavalry Regiment (Partisan Rangers)
56th Alabama Cavalry Regiment (Partisan Rangers)
Lewis' (Harrell's) Alabama Cavalry Battalion
Lowe's Alabama Cavalry Regiment (Burr Tailed Regiment)
Mead's Alabama Cavalry Battalion
Moreland's Alabama Cavalry
4th Alabama Cavalry Battalion
5th Alabama Cavalry Battalion
12th Alabama Cavalry Battalion (Partisan Rangers)
13th Alabama Cavalry Battalion (Partisan Rangers)
15th Alabama Cavalry Battalion (Partisan Rangers)
18th Alabama Cavalry Battalion (Spann’s Independent Scouts)
22nd Alabama Cavalry Battalion
23rd Alabama Cavalry Battalion
24th Alabama Cavalry Battalion
25th Alabama Cavalry Battalion (Milus E. "Bushwhacker" Johnston's Partisan Rangers)

Artillery

1st Battalion Alabama Artillery
2nd Battalion Alabama Light Artillery
2nd Battalion Alabama Light Artillery, Company A (McRae's Battery)
2nd Battalion Alabama Light Artillery, Company B (Waters' Battery)
2nd Battalion Alabama Light Artillery, Company C
2nd Battalion Alabama Light Artillery, Company D (Sengstak's Battery)
2nd Battalion Alabama Light Artillery, Company E (Gage's Battery)
2nd Battalion Alabama Light Artillery, Company F (Lumsden's Battery)
20th Battalion Alabama Artillery
Alabama State Artillery Battery (Ketchum's - Garrity's)
Barbour Alabama Light Artillery (Kolb's Battery)
Eufaula Alabama Artillery Battery
Fowler's Alabama Artillery Battery (Phelan's)
Gid. Nelson Alabama Artillery Battery
Hardaway's Alabama Artillery Battery (Hurt's)
Jeff. Davis Alabama Artillery Battery
Lee's Battery, Light Artillery
McWhorter's Alabama Artillery Battery (Clanton's)
Marks Alabama Artillery Battery (Semple's-Goldthwaite's)
Montgomery Alabama True Blues Artillery Battery
Robertson's Alabama Artillery Battery (Dent's)
Seawell's (Captain) Battery (Mohawk Artillery)
Tarrant's Alabama Artillery Battery
Waddell's Alabama Artillery Battery
Ward's Alabama Artillery Battery (Cruse's)

Miscellaneous
 1st Mobile Infantry (Local Defense)
 1st Alabama Conscripts (Echol's Company)
 1st Battalion, Cadets
 1st Conscripts
 1st Mobile Volunteers
 5th Battalion (Blount's), Volunteers
 5th Battalion, Volunteers
 18th Battalion, Volunteers
 55th Volunteers
Alabama Conscripts
Alabama Rebels
Alabama Recruits
Allen's Company
Arrington's (Captain) Company A, City Troop (Mobile)
Barbiere's Battalion, Cavalry
Barlow's (Captain) Company, Cavalry
Battalion of Conscripts and Reserves
Bay Batteries
Bowie's (Captain) Company, Cavalry
Brooks' (Captain) Company B, City Troop (Mobile)
Calhoun County Reserves
Callaway's (Captain) Company, Cavalry
Camp of Instruction, Talladega, Alabama
Chisolm's (Captain) Company
Coosa County Reserves
Crawford's (Captain) Company
Darby's (Captain) Company, Auburn Home Guards, Volunteers
Echols' (Lieutenant) Company of Conscripts
Fagg's (Captain) Company, Lowndes Rangers, Volunteers
Falkner's (Captain) Company, Cavalry (Chambers Cavalry)
Fayette County Reserves
Fire Battalion of Mobile
Forrest's Cavalry
Freeman's (Captain) Company, Prison Guard
Gachet's Company, Cavalry
Goldsmith's (Captain) Independent Company, Volunteers
Gorff's (Captain) Company (Mobile Pulaski Rifles)
Graves' Company, Cavalry
Hardy's (Captain) Company (Eufaula Minutemen)
Hert's (Captain) Company
Hilliard's Legion
Holloway's Company, Cavalry
Lee, Jr's., (Captain) Company, Volunteers
Leighton Rangers
Lenoir's (Captain) Independent Company, Cavalry
Lewis' Battalion, Cavalry
Lockett's (Captain) Company, City Guards
Meador's (Captain) Company, Volunteers
Miscellaneous, Alabama
Mobile City Troop
Montgomery Guards
Moreland's Regiment, Cavalry
Morris' (Captain) Company (Mounted Men)
Moses' (Captain) Squadron, Cavalry
Murphy's Battalion, Cavalry
Oden's, John (Captain) Company, Mounted Infantry
Orr's (Captain) Company, Morgan Defenders
Rabby's (Captain) Coast Guard Company No. 1, Volunteers
Randolph County Reserves
Reed's Supporting Force, 2d Congressional District
Rives' (Captain) Supporting Force, 9th Congressional District
Roddey's Escort, Cavalry
Shelby County Reserves
Stewart's (Lieutenant) Detachment, Local Defense
Stuart's Battalion, Cavalry
Talladega County Reserves
Toomer's (Captain) Company, Local Defense and Special Service (Chunchula Guards)
Young's (Captain) Company, Nitre and Mining Corps

Partisan Rangers
 1st (Gunter's) Battalion, Partisan Rangers (Gibson's / 18th Infantry Battalion)
 13th Battalion, Partisan Rangers
 14th Alabama Cavalry Battalion, Partisan Rangers; Malone's Brigade  (Consolidated with the 19th Cavalry Battalion, folded into the 7th, then 9th, Alabama Cavalry, fought under Gen. Wheeler the entire war)
 15th (First) Battalion, Partisan Rangers
 51st Partisan Rangers
 53rd Partisan Rangers
 56th Partisan Rangers
 Spann’s Independent Scouts (later 18th Battalion Alabama Cavalry)

Militia
 2nd Volunteer Militia
 3rd Volunteer Militia
 4th Volunteer Militia
 48th Militia
 89th Militia
 94th Militia
 95th Militia
 Bligh's (Captain) Company, Militia
 Campbell's (Captain) Company, Militia
 Gueringer's (Captain) Company, Militia
 Henry County 1st Class Militia
 Hunt's (Captain) Company, Militia
 West's (Captain) Company, Militia

Reserves
 1st Regiment Alabama Infantry Reserves (Swanson Guards / Lockhart's Battalion) (62nd Infantry Regiment)
 2nd Alabama Reserves (63rd Infantry Regiment)
 3rd Alabama Reserves 
 4th Alabama Reserves (65th Infantry Regiment)
 3rd Alabama Battalion Reserves
 Barbiere's Battalion Alabama Cavalry (Alabama Reserves)
 Hardie's Battalion, Cavalry Reserves
 Ready's Battalion, Reserves
 Belser's (Captain) Company, Reserves
 Brooks' (Captain) Company, Cavalry Reserves
 Logan's Company, Mounted Reserves
 Palmer's (Captain) Company, State Reserves
 Rankin's (Captain) Company, Reserves
 Young's Company, Cavalry (State Reserves)

See also
Lists of American Civil War Regiments by State
Alabama in the American Civil War
List of Alabama Union Civil War regiments

Sources
Dyer, Frederick Henry. A Compendium of the War of the Rebellion, Des Moines: Dyer Publishing Co. (1908).

References

External links
Consolidated Alabama Civil War Regiments
National Park Service Civil War Soldiers and Sailors Website
The Civil War Archive, Union Regimental Index: Alabama
Alabama Dept. of Archives and History Civil War Regimental History documents 

 
Alabama Civil War Confederate units, List of